James Hopkins Bailey (December 16, 1934 – October 12, 2022) was an American professional baseball player. A left-handed pitcher, Bailey played briefly in Major League Baseball for the Cincinnati Reds during the 1959 season. He was the younger brother of the late catcher Ed Bailey, who was his teammate (and batterymate) on the Reds. The Baileys were natives of Strawberry Plains, Tennessee.

He was recalled by the Reds after spending four seasons in their farm system.

In three MLB games pitched, Bailey posted a 0–1 record with seven strikeouts and a 6.17 ERA, allowing 17 hits and six bases on balls in 11⅔ innings, including one start. The start coincided with his MLB debut, September 10, 1959, at Wrigley Field against the Chicago Cubs.  With brother Ed catching for him, the rookie southpaw pitched well into the eighth inning, with only three earned runs allowed, but then surrendered three more runs to Chicago, pinning him with the 6–3 loss.

Bailey retired from pro ball in 1961 after a six-year career.

He died on October 12, 2022, at the age of 87.

References

External links

1934 births
2022 deaths
Baseball players from Tennessee
Cincinnati Reds players
Clovis Redlegs players
Lincoln Memorial Railsplitters baseball players
Macon Peaches players
Major League Baseball pitchers
Moultrie Reds players
Nashville Vols players
People from Strawberry Plains, Tennessee
Wenatchee Chiefs players